Rabbi Aharon Feldman (born 1932) is an Orthodox Jewish rabbi and rosh yeshiva (dean) of Yeshivas Ner Yisroel (Ner Israel Rabbinical College) in Baltimore, Maryland. He has held this position since 2001. He is also a member of the Moetzes Gedolei HaTorah (Council of Torah Sages).

Biography
Rabbi Aharon Feldman is the son of Rabbi Joseph Feldman (died 1993), a native of Warsaw and scion of a rabbinical family. Rabbi Josef H. Feldman served as a rabbi in Manchester, New Hampshire in the 1930s, but left that post to assume the helm of Baltimore's Franklin Street Synagogue so his sons could attend a Hebrew day school. He was the last rabbi to formally serve as chief rabbi of Baltimore. Rabbi Aharon Feldman has two brothers; his elder brother, Rabbi Emanuel Feldman, was the prominent spiritual leader of Congregation Beth Jacob of Atlanta, Georgia for 40 years. His younger brother, Rabbi Joel Feldman, was a former dean of Talmudical Academy of Baltimore.

Rabbi Feldman was born and raised in Baltimore, where he attended the Talmudical Academy and Ner Yisroel, becoming a close disciple of Rosh Yeshiva, Rabbi Yitzchak Ruderman. Afterwards he taught in several yeshivas in New York. He has dual citizenship to both Israel and America, and is in line for a position as MK in the Israeli parliament in the Degal HaTorah party.

In 1961 Rabbi Feldman and his wife Leah made aliyah with their family to Israel in order to raise their eight children in a more religious environment. They lived in Bnei Brak for 12 years and relocated to Jerusalem in 1973. Rabbi Feldman served as one of the Rosh Yeshivas of Ohr Somayach Yeshiva for many years, and also founded Yeshiva Be'er HaTorah in Jerusalem in the early 1990s.

In 2001 Rabbi Feldman accepted the request of Ner Yisroel to serve as its Rosh Yeshiva.

In 2005, he was one of 15 Jewish educators invited to an informal discussion on Jewish education in the White House's Roosevelt Room.

Rabbi Feldman serves on the Moetzes Gedolai Hatorah of America.[11]

Public positions
In 1994, Rabbi Feldman spoke publicly against the actions of Baruch Goldstein saying that there could be "no justification", and describing the actions as "way beyond the pale".

In 2003, in response to a question from Gil Student, Feldman issued a ruling regarding Chabad messianists. He drew a distinction between what he terms the "meshichists" (those who believe the late Rabbi Menachem Mendel Schneerson is the messiah) and the "elokists" (those who believe he was a part of God or God "clothed in a body"). He ruled that it is forbidden to associate with elokists under any circumstances due to their heresy and that they cannot be counted for a minyan, stating that most Chabad adherents do not fall under that category. Regarding the meshichists, he determined that while their beliefs do not make them heretics, it is forbidden to conduct any action which would be seen as lending credence to their messianic beliefs.

Feldman has penned a lengthy critical review of the Steinsaltz Talmud. Among many criticisms, he writes, "Specifically, the work is marred by an extraordinary number of inaccuracies stemming primarily from misreadings of the sources; it fails to explain those difficult passages which the reader would expect it to explain; and it confuses him with notes which are often irrelevant, incomprehensible, and contradictory." Feldman says he fears that, "An intelligent student utilizing the Steinsaltz Talmud as his personal instructor might in fact conclude that Talmud in general is not supposed to make sense." Furthermore, writes Feldman, the Steinsaltz Talmud gives off the impression that the Talmud is intellectually flabby, inconsistent, and often trivial.

In 2005, he wrote a critique of Rabbi Natan Slifkin, explaining and defending the 2004 ban issued against Slifkin's books.

Feldman has been an opponent of Open Orthodoxy. He argues that "The basis of Orthodox Judaism is a belief in the Divine origin of both the Oral and Written Torah. Yeshivat Chovevei Torah’s leaders or their graduates have said clearly or implicitly on many occasions that they do not accept that the Torah was authored by Hashem, that parts of the Torah can be excised, and that the Oral Law was developed by Rabbis to adjust the Written Torah to the realities of the time that they lived in. This basic philosophy is what writes them out of Orthodox Jewry."

Rav Feldman has written and spoken strongly against the ideology of Zionism. In a letter to R. Aharon Lichtenstein, He quoted their mutual Rebbe, Rav Yitzhok Hutner as saying that Zionism is "pure apikorsus." He also quoted R. JB Soloveitchik (R. Lichtenstein's father in law) as saying Leumius (Zionism) is Apikorsus.

In 2020, Rav Feldman gave the keynote address at the Annual Agudah Convention. He spoke about the fact that the Eretz Hakodesh slate joining the WZO violated what a century of Gedolei Torah (from the Chofetz Chaim to Rav Elyashiv) warned Torah Jews not to do. He asserted that alleged support for the project from Rav Chaim was not true. He stated that all of the reasons the Gedolim had for not joining in with the Zionist organization still held today. Among the reasons he gave is that in order to join one had to agree to the kfirah of the Jerusalem program, and that by joining with reform and other groups it seems like a legitimization of those groups, which are strictly forbidden. He described  the kefirah of Zionism as a dismantling of the Torah by making the land, language, and culture central to the Jewish People as opposed to only the Torah.

Selected bibliography

Mishnah Berurah: The Classic Commentary to Shulchan Aruch Orach Chayim, Comprising the Laws of Daily Jewish Conduct (editor, Hebrew-English edition, 12 volumes)
Yad L'Peah on Maseches Peah (1967)  (Book Review in HaPardes; digital edition of Yad L'Peah at the Ner Israel Archive).

External links
Article in Yeshurun Journal regarding Vilna Gaon's attempt to travel to Israel
Torah Article in Yeshurun Journal

References

American Haredi rabbis
American people of Polish-Jewish descent
Rosh yeshivas
Israeli Rosh yeshivas
Rabbis of Ohr Somayach
Yeshivas Ner Yisroel
Religious leaders from Baltimore
People from Jerusalem
1932 births
Living people
Rabbis from Baltimore
Anti-Zionist Haredi rabbis